Panawa (Bujiyel) is an East Kainji language of Nigeria belonging to the Shammo cluster.

Panawa is mostly closely related to Boze.

Distribution
There are probably no more than 3,000-4,000 ethnic Panawa. The Panawa live in the following five villages of Toro LGA, Bauchi State.

Akusεru (Fadan Bujiyel)
Zabaŋa
Adizənə
Akayzoro
Kaŋkay

The 5 Panawa villages were originally located on a hill called Owo Panawa. All 5 villages were relocated down to the plains in 1948, retaining their original names and clan structures. Each of the villages corresponds to an exogamous clan.

References

East Kainji languages
Languages of Nigeria